Guillermo Iván Dueñas Lazcano (born 19 January 1981) is a Mexican actor, director, writer, and producer. Born in Mexico City, Mexico. He is best known for his characters in Mexican and American films. On television he made himself known as part of the main cast of Telemundo's telenovela Al otro lado del muro. Graduated from the Faculty of Arts and Letters at the University of Havana, Guillermo Iván received a degree in production and direction from the National Union of Writers and Artists of Cuba.

Filmography

References

External links 
 

1981 births
Living people
20th-century Mexican male actors
21st-century Mexican male actors
Mexican male telenovela actors
Mexican male television actors
People from Mexico City
Mexican male writers
Mexican television producers
Mexican television directors